Purple Skies is a 2014 movie directed by Sridhar Rangayan and produced by Public Service Broadcasting Trust and Solaris Pictures. It documents the opinions of lesbians, bisexuals and trans men in India. It was broadcast on Doordarshan in 2015.

The documentary film showcases stories of the LGBT community about living in India and is the first documentary on LGBT topics to be screened on a national network, Doordarshan. As of 2015, it has been screened at 27 international film festivals.

Cast 
 Betu Singh
 Sonal Giani
 Maya Lisa-Shanker
 Shobhna S Kumar
 Raj Kanaujiya

Screenings 
 38 Frameline San Francisco International LGBT Film Festival
 GAZE International LGBT Film Festival, Dublin
 5th Annual Chicago South Asian Film Festival, 2014
 13th Prague Indian Film Festival, 2014
 10th Gay Film Night International Film Festival, Romania, 2014
 18th Seattle Lesbian & Gay Film Festival, USA, 2014 
 13th Q! Film Festival, Indonesia, 2014
 Trikone Australasia Queer Film Night, Melbourne, Australia, 2014
 3rd Everybody's Perfect, Geneva, Switzerland, 2014
 South Asian Film Festival, North Carolina, 2014
 Florence Queer Festival, Italy, 2014 
 Festival of Lesbian Identities, Budapest, 2014
 Sappho LGBT Film Festival, Kolkata, 2014
 5th KASHISH Mumbai International Queer Film Festival, Mumbai

References

External links 
 IMDB
 Solaris Pictures 
 

Indian LGBT-related films
LGBT-related films based on actual events
2014 LGBT-related films
Documentary films about LGBT topics
Indian documentary films